Ronald's opossum (Monodelphis ronaldi) is a South American opossum species of the family Didelphidae. It was discovered in 2004, and most closely resembles M. adusta. It is known only from Manú National Park, Peru, where it inhabits the Amazon rainforest. It is named after American zoologist Ronald H. Pine.

References

Opossums
Mammals of Peru
Mammals described in 2004